Clifford Alistair Calvert (born 21 April 1954) is an English former professional footballer.

Career
Born in York, Calvert joined York City as an amateur in the early 1970s and signed full-time professional terms in July 1972. He was capped by the England national youth team in 1972. He made his debut against Plymouth Argyle in March 1973 in the 1972–73 season. He figured prominently for the club as they won promotion in the 1973–74 season. After making 75 appearances for the club, he was transferred to Sheffield United for a record club fee received of £30,000 in September 1975. He made 81 appearances and scored five goals in the league for United and went on to play for Toronto Blizzard and Dallas Tornado in the North American Soccer League.

References

External links
NASL

1954 births
Living people
Footballers from York
English footballers
England youth international footballers
English expatriate footballers
English expatriate sportspeople in Canada
English expatriate sportspeople in the United States
Expatriate soccer players in Canada
Expatriate soccer players in the United States
Association football defenders
York City F.C. players
Sheffield United F.C. players
Toronto Blizzard (1971–1984) players
Dallas Tornado players
Buffalo Stallions players
English Football League players
North American Soccer League (1968–1984) players